Evolutionary capacitance is the storage and release of variation, just as electric capacitors store and release charge. Living systems are robust to mutations. This means that living systems accumulate genetic variation without the variation having a phenotypic effect. But when the system is disturbed (perhaps by stress), robustness breaks down, and the variation has phenotypic effects and is subject to the full force of natural selection. An evolutionary capacitor is a molecular switch mechanism that can "toggle" genetic variation between hidden and revealed states.  If some subset of newly revealed variation is adaptive, it becomes fixed by genetic assimilation. After that, the rest of variation, most of which is presumably deleterious, can be switched off, leaving the population with a newly evolved advantageous trait, but no long-term handicap. For evolutionary capacitance to increase evolvability in this way, the switching rate should not be faster than the timescale of genetic assimilation.

This mechanism would allow for rapid adaptation to new environmental conditions. Switching rates may be a function of stress, making genetic variation more likely to affect the phenotype at times when it is most likely to be useful for adaptation. In addition, strongly deleterious variation may be purged while in a partially cryptic state, so cryptic variation that remains is more likely to be adaptive than random mutations are. Capacitance can help cross "valleys" in the fitness landscape, where a combination of two mutations would be beneficial, even though each is deleterious on its own.

There is currently no consensus about the extent to which capacitance might contribute to evolution in natural populations. The possibility of evolutionary capacitance is considered to be part of the extended evolutionary synthesis.

Switches that turn robustness to phenotypic rather than genetic variation on and off do not fit the capacitance analogy, as their presence does not cause variation to accumulate over time. They have instead been called phenotypic stabilizers.

Enzyme promiscuity

In addition to their native reaction, many enzymes perform side reactions. Similarly, binding proteins may spend some proportion of their time bound to off-target proteins. These reactions or interactions may be of no consequence to current fitness but under altered conditions, may provide the starting point for adaptive evolution. For example, several mutations in the antibiotic resistance gene B-lactamase introduce cefotaxime resistance but do not affect ampicillin resistance. In populations exposed only to ampicillin, such mutations may be present in a minority of members since there is not fitness cost (i.e. are within the neutral network). This represents cryptic genetic variation since if the population is newly exposed to cefotaxime, the minority members will exhibit some resistance.

Chaperones
Chaperones assist in protein folding. The need to fold proteins correctly is a big restriction on the evolution of protein sequences. It has been proposed that the presence of chaperones may, by providing additional robustness to errors in folding, allow the exploration of a larger set of genotypes. When chaperones are overworked at times of environmental stress, this may "switch on" previously cryptic genetic variation.

Hsp90
The hypothesis that chaperones can act as evolutionary capacitors is closely associated with the heat shock protein Hsp90. When Hsp90 is downregulated in the fruit fly Drosophila melanogaster, a broad range of different phenotypes are seen, where the identity of the phenotype depends on the genetic background. Also, a recent study on the model insect, the red flour beetle Tribolium castaneum, showed that Hsp90 impairment revealed a new phenotype, reduced-eye phenotype, which was stably inherited without further HSP90 inhibition (https://doi.org/10.1101/690727). This was thought to prove that the new phenotypes depended on pre-existing cryptic genetic variation that had merely been revealed. More recent evidence suggests that these data might be explained by new mutations caused by the reactivation of formally dormant transposable elements. However, this finding regarding transposable elements may be dependent on the strong nature of the Hsp90 knockdown used in that experiment.

GroEL

The overproduction of GroEL in Escherichia coli increases mutational robustness. This can increase evolvability.

Yeast prion [PSI+]

Sup35p is a yeast protein involved in recognising stop codons and causing translation to stop correctly at the ends of proteins. Sup35p comes in a normal form ([psi-]) and a prion form ([PSI+]). When [PSI+] is present, this depletes the amount of normal Sup35p available. As a result, the rate of errors in which translation continues beyond a stop codon increases from about 0.3% to about 1%.

This can lead to different growth rates, and sometimes different morphologies, in matched [PSI+] and [psi-] strains in a variety of stressful environments. Sometimes the [PSI+] strain grows faster, sometimes [psi-]: this depends on the genetic background of the strain, suggesting that [PSI+] taps into pre-existing cryptic genetic variation. Mathematical models suggest that [PSI+] may have evolved, as an evolutionary capacitor, to promote evolvability.

[PSI+] appears more frequently in response to environmental stress. In yeast, more stop codon disappearances are in-frame, mimicking the effects of [PSI+], than would be expected from mutation bias or than are observed in other taxa that do not form the [PSI+] prion. These observations are compatible with [PSI+] acting as an evolutionary capacitor in the wild.

Similar transient increases in error rates can evolve emergently in the absence of a "widget" like [PSI+]. The primary advantage of a [PSI+]-like widget is to facilitate the subsequent evolution of lower error rates once genetic assimilation has occurred.

Gene knockouts

Evolutionary capacitance may also be a general feature of complex gene networks, and can be seen in simulations of gene knockouts. A screen of all gene knockouts in yeast found that many act as phenotypic stabilizers. Knocking out a regulatory protein such as a chromatin regulator may lead to more effective capacitance than knocking out a metabolic enzyme.

Facultative sex

Recessive mutations can be thought of as cryptic when they are present overwhelmingly in heterozygotes rather than homozygotes. Facultative sex that takes the form of selfing can act as an evolutionary capacitor in a primarily asexual population by creating homozygotes. Facultative sex that takes the form of outcrossing can act as an evolutionary capacitor by breaking up allele combinations with phenotypic effects that normally cancel out.

See also
Canalization (genetics)
Epigenetics
Preadaptation
Susan Lindquist

References

Evolutionary biology
Extended evolutionary synthesis
Selection